Rimonim, is an Israeli settlement in the West Bank. Located on the Allon Road, about a twenty-minute drive east from Jerusalem, it falls under the jurisdiction of Mateh Binyamin Regional Council.

The international community considers Israeli settlements in the West Bank illegal under international law, but the Israeli government disputes this.

Etymology
The village is named after the biblical Rock of Rimmon (present-day Rammun). The name comes from the Book of Judges:

History
According to ARIJ, Israel confiscated 393 dunam of land from the nearby Palestinian town of Taybeh in order to construct Rimonim in 1977.

Rimonim was first established in 1977 (20 Shevat 5737) as a temporary pioneer Nahal military outpost. Three years later in 1980 (on 4 Tishrei 5741), it moved to the current location, demilitarized and turned over to residential purposes non-religious Jewish Israelis with help from the Amana settlement organization. In the mid-2000s the village allowed religious Jews to move in. Until then, it had been almost exclusively secular in nature.

Services provided include a synagogue, half-Olympic sized swimming pool, post office, nursery, kindergarten, mikveh, library, basketball court, and youth centre.

At the edge of town, there is a look-out point, from which one can view the Jordan Valley and the Dead Sea.

The town has ancient Roman and Byzantine ruins.

References

External links
Official website
Rimonim Mateh Binyamin Regional Council

Nahal settlements
Mixed Israeli settlements
Mateh Binyamin Regional Council
Populated places established in 1977
1977 establishments in the Israeli Military Governorate
Agricultural Union
Community settlements
Israeli settlements in the West Bank